Federal Communications Commission v. Fox Television Stations, Inc., 556 U.S. 502 (2009), is a decision by the United States Supreme Court that upheld regulations of the Federal Communications Commission that ban "fleeting expletives" on television broadcasts, finding they were not arbitrary and capricious under the Administrative Procedure Act. The constitutional issue, however, was not resolved and was remanded to the Second Circuit and re-appealed to the Supreme Court for a decision in June 2012.

Background
The case entered the Supreme Court's docket in October 2007 and specifically concerns obscene language broadcast on the Fox television network from two Billboard Music Awards shows from 2002 and 2003. In the 2002 show, presenter Cher said "fuck 'em" regarding people who she believed criticized her; in the 2003 show, presenter Nicole Richie stated regarding her television show: “Why do they even call it The Simple Life? Have you ever tried to get cow shit out of a Prada purse? It’s not so fucking simple.” 

In 2004, the FCC prohibited "single uses of vulgar words" under any circumstances, including previous instances where it gave leeway for "fleeting" expletives that networks unknowingly allowed to enter the airwaves. However, the United States Court of Appeals for the Second Circuit ruled in the case Fox et al. v. Federal Communications Commission (06-1760) that the FCC cannot punish broadcast stations for such incidents.

On the week of March 17, 2008, the Supreme Court announced that it would hear this case. The Supreme Court heard arguments from the case on November 4, 2008, which was also Election Day. Chief Justice John G. Roberts and Associate Justice Antonin Scalia expressed support for the FCC.

Supreme Court decision
The Supreme Court ruled in a 5–4 decision on April 28, 2009 that the Federal Communications Commission had not acted arbitrarily when it changed a long-standing policy and implemented a new ban on even "fleeting expletives" from the airwaves. The Court explicitly declined to decide whether the new rule is constitutional, and sent that issue back to the lower courts for their review. Justice Antonin Scalia, in the majority opinion, wrote: "The FCC’s new policy and its order finding the broadcasts at issue actionably indecent were neither arbitrary nor capricious." In the dissenting opinion, Justice John Paul Stevens claimed that this decision was hypocritical given the presence of television commercials for products treating impotence or constipation.

First Amendment question
In its decision, "the court did not definitively settle the First Amendment implications of allowing a federal agency to censor broadcasts," and left that issue for the Second Circuit Court of Appeals.  However, Justice Clarence Thomas's separate opinion openly stated his willingness to overturn Federal Communications Commission v. Pacifica Foundation and Red Lion Broadcasting Co. v. Federal Communications Commission, the two cases on which all FCC authority rest, even as he joined the majority on procedural grounds.

Subsequent history

Upon remand, the Second Circuit addressed the actual Constitutionality of the fleeting expletive rules, striking it down in July 2010. The FCC re-appealed the case. On June 21, 2012, the Court decided the re-appeal narrowly, striking down the fines as unconstitutionally vague, but upholding the authority of the FCC to act in the interests of the general public when licensing broadcast spectrums to enforce decency standards, so long as they are not vague, without violating the First Amendment.

See also
 FCC v. Pacifica Foundation
 List of United States Supreme Court cases, volume 556
List of United States Supreme Court cases

References

External links

 Fox et al. v. Federal Communications Commission oral argument on archive.org - 2nd Circuit Court of Appeals
Associated Press article about the case

United States Supreme Court cases
United States Supreme Court cases of the Roberts Court
Federal Communications Commission litigation
 
Censorship of broadcasting in the United States
Obscenity law
2009 in United States case law
2009 in American television
Media case law
20th Century Fox litigation

Fox Broadcasting Company